The 2008 European Weightlifting Championships were held in Lignano Sabbiadoro, Italy from 11 to 20 April 2008. It was the 87th edition of the event, which was first staged in 1896.

Medal overview

Men

Women

Medal table
Ranking by Big (Total result) medals

Ranking by all medals: Big (Total result) and Small (Snatch and Clean & Jerk)

References
Official site
IWF results

European Weightlifting Championships
E
European Weightlifting Championships
International weightlifting competitions hosted by Italy
European Weightlifting Championships